Rodney ("Rod") David Blackmore OAM (born 7 August 1935), is a former senior magistrate in the Australian state of New South Wales. He is perhaps best known for his work with children and adolescents. Blackmore's last judicial posting was as the Senior Magistrate at the Children's Court of New South Wales, serving from 1978 to 1995.

Biography

Youth and early legal career

Blackmore was born in Deniliquin where his father Cecil was clerk of the court at the time of Rodney's birth. His parents deliberately named him "Rodney David" to achieve identification (via his initials) with the author of Lorna Doone. He came from a legal family; both his father, Cecil Hargreaves Blackmore, and paternal grandfather, Hugh Moffitt Blackmore, had served as New South Wales magistrates (Cecil was a Stipendiary Magistrate 1946–1960). Rodney's mother was Lydia Mabel Norris. Cecil Blackmore was appointed as clerk of the court in Grafton from 1937 to 1943, after which the family moved to Haberfield in Sydney.

After being educated at Grafton, New South Wales Public School (1940) and Haberfield Demonstration School, Rodney Blackmore was selected to attend Summer Hill School Summer Hill in opportunity class and then at Fort Street Boys' High (1947-1951) (see List of Fortians). On 12 April 1958, Blackmore married Elizabeth Anne James at Summer Hill Methodist Church, Sydney, where they had met due to Blackmore's playing organ for a number of local Sydney churches. Their children Leigh Blackmore, Kent and Melinda were born respectively in 1959, 1960 and 1962.

Rodney Blackmore gained a Diploma in Law through the Solicitors Admission Board in 1967 and worked in courts administration from 1951. He was Clerk of Petty Sessions in Camden, Clerk of Petty Sessions and Coroner in Armidale, instructing officer at Central Criminal Court, Clerk of Petty Sessions and chamber magistrate at Campsie, Clerk of Petty Sessions and assistant chamber magistrate at the Central Court of Petty Sessions in Darlinghurst Sydney and then chamber magistrate in Sydney.

Magisterial career

He was commissioned as a Stipendiary Magistrate in 1970. Blackmore was the Parramatta coroner in 1971 and then the traffic magistrate in Kogarah in 1971–72.

From 1972 to 1977 Blackmore and his family lived in Newcastle while he served for five years as the circuit magistrate for the Hunter Region, based in Maitland.

In 1977 he became Special Magistrate at Metropolitan Children's Court at Albion Street, Sydney, also known as (Albion Street, Surry Hills) Children's Court.The office of Senior Special Magistrate was created and Senior Children's Magistrate Blackmore (as he later was known) took up that position on 8 August 1978. Metropolitan Children's Court at Albion Street closed in 1983 after Bidura Children's Court opened in Glebe. The court still operates today. However, due to frequent escapes from the Bidura Remand and Assessment Centre, it is now used only to hold juveniles appearing in court that day. 

Blackmore was a founding member of the Homeless Children's Association  in 1980 and its president from 1984 to 1991.

In 1988, Blackmore became the first Senior Children's Court Magistrate of NSW, a position he filled with distinction until his 1995 retirement thirteen years later. In 1989 he wrote the only standard text on the Children's Court in NSW and on the Children and Young Persons (Care and Protection) Act 1998. He later performed his duties at Bidura Children's Court in Glebe. He was featured presiding on the bench at Bidura in the Film Australia documentary Kids in Trouble directed by Sue Cornwell.

In 1995 he became Chairman of the Trustees for the Mangrove Mountain, New South Wales Homeless Persons' Reserve Trust (formerly the Homeless Children's Association); this trust was for some time managed by Wesley Mission in conjunction with its Mangrove Mountain retreat for disadvantaged children. An accommodation lodge at the trust's property near Gosford site was named 'Blackmore Lodge' in his honour.

Awards
Blackmore was awarded the Order of Australia Medal in 1997 for his service to the welfare of children through the judicial system and to the community.

Personal life
He is the longest continuous member of the Theatre Organ Society of Australia (TOSA), having joined its NSW Division in March 1960 (within 2 months of the society's inauguration). . He edited its journal The Diaphone from 1963 until its cessation in 1969.

He is also a former president and Activities Director of the Probus Club of Hornsby, New South Wales. He lives with his wife Beth in Sydney.

Selected bibliography

Issues impacting children and the legal system

Theatre Organ matters
 As editor.  Publication ceased with Vol 7, No 4 (Nov 1969) 

 A History of Theatre Pipe Organs in Australia and New Zealand (Thornleigh NSW: Rod Blackmore, 2011) 

. On the theatre organ at the Astra Theatre, Drummoyne, Sydney.
.
.
.
.

References

Further reading
 Christa Ludlow. 'For Their Own Good': A History of the Children's Court and Boys' Shelter at Albion St, Surry Hills. Royal Australian Historical Society, Nov 1994, pp 33–34.
 "The Children’s Court of New South Wales: Timeline of major events 1905 – 2011"

External links
Rod Blackmore's Australasian Theatre Organs

1935 births
Living people
Australian magistrates
Recipients of the Medal of the Order of Australia
People educated at Fort Street High School
Australian classical organists
Male classical organists
Lawyers from Sydney
Theatre organists
21st-century organists
21st-century Australian male musicians
21st-century Australian musicians